Prophet is the second album by Ramona Falls, the moniker of Brent Knopf, better known for being one third of the band Menomena.

Track listing

Bodies of Water
The Space Between Lightning And Thunder
Spore
Divide By Zero
Archimedes Plutonium
Sqworm
Fingerhold
If I Equals U
Brevony
Proof
Helium

Ramona Falls (band) albums
2012 albums